Bruce & Morgan was an American architectural firm based in Atlanta. It was established in 1882 as the partnership of architects Alexander Campbell Bruce (1835-1927) and Thomas Henry Morgan (1857-1940).

History
Bruce & Morgan were the successors to Parkins & Bruce. Senior partner William H. Parkins was the first architect to practice in postbellum Atlanta, having moved there in 1868. Although the firm designed a range of buildings types and sizes, the firm largely focused on designing public buildings (courthouses, schools, religious buildings, etc.).  The firm's major projects often contain Romanesque elements such as bell towers and attempts at classical architectural symmetry. In the twentieth century, the firm's projects shifted towards steel framed skyscrapers in Atlanta. In 1903 the partnership was expanded to include John Robert Dillon, formerly of Chicago, and became known as Bruce, Morgan & Dillon. Bruce withdrew from the partnership in 1904, after which it became known as Morgan & Dillon and later Morgan, Dillon & Lewis. Under Morgan's leadership the firm lasted until his death in 1940.

Legacy
The firm produced many works which are preserved and listed on the United States National Register of Historic Places.

Architectural works

Its works (credits) include:
Atkinson Hall, Georgia College, Georgia College campus, Milledgeville, GA (Bruce & Morgan) NRHP-listed
Samuel H. Brodnax House, GA 81, Walnut Grove, GA 	Bruce & Morgan) NRHP-listed
Brooks County Courthouse, Courthouse Sq., Quitman, GA (Bruce & Morgan) NRHP-listed
Bulloch County Courthouse, 1894, Courthouse Sq., Statesboro, GA (Bruce & Morgan) NRHP-listed
Butts County Courthouse, Courthouse Sq., Jackson, GA (Bruce & Morgan) NRHP-listed
J. R. Carmichael House, 149 McConough Rd., Jackson, GA (Bruce & Morgan) NRHP-listed
Central of Georgia Railroad Terminal (1200 6th Ave., Columbus, Georgia) (1901), 1200 6th Ave., Columbus, GA (Bruce & Morgan) NRHP-listed
Fayette County Courthouse, GA 85, Fayetteville, GA (Bruce & Morgan) NRHP-listed
 Fire Station No. 6, 39 Boulevard NE, Atlanta, GA (Bruce & Morgan) Martin Luther King, Jr. NHL District contributing structure.
Floyd County Courthouse, 5th Ave., and Tribune St., Rome, GA (Bruce & Morgan) NRHP-listed
Georgia Institute of Technology Administration Building (Tech Tower), 225 North Avenue NW, Atlanta, GA (Bruce & Morgan) NRHP-listed 
Monroe County Courthouse, Courthouse Sq., Forsyth, GA (Bruce & Morgan) NRHP-listed
Newton County Courthouse, Courthouse Sq., Covington, GA (Bruce & Morgan) NRHP-listed
Oakland Cemetery, 248 Oakland Ave., SE, Atlanta, GA (Bruce & Morgan) NRHP-listed
Paulding County Courthouse, Courthouse Sq., Dallas, GA (Bruce & Morgan) NRHP-listed
Samford Hall, Auburn University, Auburn, Alabama
M. Rich and Brothers and Company Building at 82 Peachtree St. SE, Atlanta, GA (location of Rich's (department store); 1906 renovation and expansion of the original 1882 building) 

Talbot County Courthouse, Courthouse Sq., Talbotton, GA (Bruce & Morgan) NRHP-listed
Walton County Courthouse, Courthouse Sq., Monroe, GA (Bruce & Morgan) NRHP-listed
Wigwam Hotel
One or more works in Clemson University Historic District I; Tillman Hall at Clemson University, northern portion of campus along US 76, Clemson, SC (Bruce & Morgan) NRHP-listed. 
One or more works in Covington Historic District, Roughly Covington City S of US 278, Covington, GA (Bruce and Morgan) NRHP-listed
One or more works in Hotel Row Historic District, 205—235 Mitchell St., Atlanta, GA (Bruce & Morgan) NRHP-listed
One or more works in Monroe Commercial Historic District, Spring and Broad Sts., Monroe, GA (Bruce & Morgan) NRHP-listed
One or more works in Winthrop College Historic District, along Oakland Ave. between Cherry Rd. and Stewart Ave. on the Winthrop College campus, Rock Hill, South Carolina (Bruce & Morgan) NRHP-listed

See also
St. Nicholas Hotel, 141 Flint Ave., 300—310 Washington St., Albany, GA (Bruce & Everett) NRHP-listed

References

Architecture firms based in Georgia (U.S. state)